Marek Fabuľa (born 5 August 1975) is a Slovak former footballer and manager.

External links
 Futbalnet profile

References

1975 births
Living people
Sportspeople from Prešov
Slovak footballers
Slovak football managers
1. FC Tatran Prešov players
MFK Vranov nad Topľou players
ŠK Slovan Bratislava players
MFK Ružomberok players
FC VSS Košice players
FC DAC 1904 Dunajská Streda players
Slovak Super Liga players
Cypriot First Division players
Cypriot Second Division players
FK Železiarne Podbrezová managers
MFK Tatran Liptovský Mikuláš managers
FC VSS Košice managers
Slovak Super Liga managers
2. Liga (Slovakia) managers
Expatriate footballers in Cyprus
Slovak expatriate sportspeople in Cyprus
Expatriate football managers in Mongolia
Slovak expatriate sportspeople in Mongolia
Association football midfielders